Dressbarn.com (branded as dressbarn) is an online retailer owned by Retail Ecommerce Ventures. Its predecessor is the former chain of women's clothing stores owned by Ascena which operated as Dressbarn from 1962 until 2019. Since 2020, it is owned by Miami, Florida-based Retail Ecommerce Ventures.

The first Dressbarn was opened in February 1962 by Roslyn Jaffe in Stamford, Connecticut. Jaffe stocked  wear-to-work dresses and clothing for working women during an era of women entering the workforce in greater numbers.

The company began trading on NASDAQ (symbol DBRN) in 1982. In January 2011, to reflect its broader holdings, the company was reorganized as a Delaware corporation named Ascena Retail Group, Inc.,with its NASDAQ symbol changed to ASNA in 2011.

On May 21, 2019, Ascena Retail Group announced that its 650 DressBarn Stores would be closing, which occurred that December 26th. Eventually, the Dressbarn brand was sold by Ascena to Retail Ecommerce Ventures, then newly established by Tai Lopez and Alex Mehr, with the site relaunched in 2020.

On March 2, 2023, Retail Ecommerce Ventures, Dressbarn's current parent, announced that it was mulling a possible bankruptcy filing.

References 

Clothing retailers of the United States

American companies established in 1962
Retail companies established in 1962
Retail companies disestablished in 2019
1962 establishments in New Jersey
1962 establishments in Connecticut
Companies based in Bergen County, New Jersey
Retail companies based in New Jersey
Mahwah, New Jersey
Online retailers of the United States
American companies established in 2020
Retail companies established in 2020
Internet properties established in 2020
Ascena Retail Group
Defunct retail companies of the United States
1980s initial public offerings